The King George V Sports Ground is a cricket ground in Castel, Guernsey. It hosted matches in the 2009 ICC World Cricket League Division Seven tournament, and hosted matches in the Regional Finals of the 2018–19 ICC World Twenty20 Europe Qualifier tournament in June 2019. On 30 May 2020, the ground hosted the first match in the United Kingdom after lockdown restrictions were eased during the COVID-19 pandemic.

International record

Twenty20 International five-wicket hauls
One T20I five-wicket haul has been taken at this venue.

References

Sport in Guernsey